David Albright Okeke (born 15 September 1998) is an Italian professional basketball player of Nigerian descent who plays for Keflavík in the Icelandic Úrvalsdeild karla. In 2021, he won the Georgian Superliga championship with BC Rustavi.

Career
Born in Monza, Italy, Okeke grew up in Robbio and Novara. After playing football, he got his basketball career underway, playing at Mortara, Stella Azzurra Roma and Casale. In the 2014–15 season, Okeke averaged 8.5 points a game for Borgomanero Basket Giovane in Italy’s Serie C.

Climbing the ranks, he competed in the national second-tier Serie B in the 2015–16 season, tallying 4.0 points a contest for Oleggio Magic Basket.

The 2016–17 season saw Okeke make his debut in Italy’s top-flight LBA after signing with Auxilium Torino, known as Fiat Torino for sponsorship reasons. He averaged 2.3 points and 1.4 rebounds per contest in his first Serie A season.

In the 2017–18 season, Okeke won the Italian Basketball Cup with Torino. He also made his European debut with Torino, playing in the EuroCup, where he played 12.5 minutes per game. In these minutes, he managed to average 4 points on 72% field goal shooting.

In 2019, he decleared for the NBA Draft. He went undrafted in the 2019 NBA Draft.

After almost three years without playing basketball due to health reasons (Heart), Okeke made his comeback with Georgian side BC Rustavi in January 2021. In 18 games, he averaged 9.3 points and 6.8 rebounds, helping the team to the Georgian Superliga championship.

In August 2021, Okeke signed with Úrvalsdeild karla club Keflavík. On 28 October 2021, Okeke scored a season high 31 points in a victory against Breiðablik. On 10 December 2021, he suffered an achilles injury in a game against Tindastóll. Prior to the injury he had grabbed a season high 17 rebounds in the game. In 9 games, he averaged 19.6 points and 11.2 rebounds per game. In April 2022, it was reported that he had signed with Keflavík for the following season.

National team career 
Okeke was a member of Italy’s team at the 2017 FIBA Under-19 World Cup in Cairo, when the team won silver. Okeke saw action in seven games during the tournament, averaging 11 points and 6.3 rebounds per outing.

References

External links
Profile at Eurobasket.com
Profile at Basketball-Reference
Serie A profile  Retrieved 17 July 2017
FIBA profile Retrieved 17 July 2017
Auxilium Torino profile  Retrieved 17 July 2017
Icelandic statistics at Icelandic Basketball Association

1998 births
Living people
Auxilium Pallacanestro Torino players
Italian men's basketball players
Italian people of Nigerian descent
Italian sportspeople of African descent
David Okeke
Lega Basket Serie A players
Power forwards (basketball)
Sportspeople from Monza
Small forwards
David Okeke